Speed metal is an extreme subgenre of heavy metal music that originated in the late 1970s from new wave of British heavy metal (NWOBHM) roots. It is described by AllMusic as "extremely fast, abrasive, and technically demanding" music.

It is usually considered less abrasive and more melodic than thrash metal, showing less influence from hardcore punk. However, speed metal is usually faster and more aggressive than traditional heavy metal, also showing more inclination to virtuoso soloing and featuring short instrumental passages between couplets. Speed metal songs frequently make use of highly expressive vocals, but are usually less likely to employ "harsh" vocals than thrash metal songs.

Origins

New wave of British heavy metal
One of the key influences on the development of speed metal was the new wave of British heavy metal, or NWOBHM. This was a heavy metal movement that started in the late 1970s, in Britain, and achieved international attention by the early 1980s. NWOBHM bands toned down the blues influences of earlier acts, incorporated elements of punk, increased the tempo, and adopted a "tougher" sound, taking a harder approach to their music.

It was an era directed almost exclusively at heavy metal fans and is considered to be a major foundation stone for the extreme metal genres.

The NWOBHM came to dominate the heavy metal scene of the early-mid-1980s. It was musically characterized by fast upbeat tempo songs, power chords, fast guitar solos and melodic, soaring vocals. Groups such as Iron Maiden, Judas Priest, Venom, Saxon and Motörhead as well as many lesser-known ones, became part of the canon that influenced American bands that formed in the early eighties.

Other metal influences

Motörhead is often credited as the first band to play speed metal in the mid-1970s. The Sweet released "Sweet F.A." and "Set Me Free" in April of 1974 which heavily influenced speed metal later in the decade. Some of speed metal's earlier influences include Black Sabbath's "Children of the Grave" and "Symptom of the Universe", Budgie's "Breadfan" and Queen's "Stone Cold Crazy" (the latter two were eventually covered by the thrash metal band Metallica), as well as certain Deep Purple songs such as "Speed King", "Fireball" and "Highway Star". The latter was called "early speed metal" by Robb Reiner of speed metal band Anvil.

History
The origin of the genre's name is the aptly named "Speed King" by Deep Purple. Recording on the song started in 1969 making it nearly a full decade ahead of the musical style being recognized. The song is not only very fast and technical but was also extremely loud creating noticeable distortion in the recording process. The title song for the band's next album, Fireball, is a further refinement of the band's influence with drummer Ian Paice's use of the double bass drum. The way the double bass drum is played in "Fireball"—uptempo "four on the floor"—became a mainstay in many heavy, speed and thrash metal songs in the years that followed. 

This is the only Deep Purple song that employs the double bass drum, and the video from the band shows them actually bring out the second bass as needed to play the song. While speedy, technical playing did not dominate Deep Purple's music, they clearly were the inventors of rock that was fast, technical and loud. Those characteristics would become the hallmarks of speed metal. The name of the origin song, "Speed King" would have also played a role in the genre's naming. At the very least, the band acknowledged what they were doing which was a radical departure from all prior rock music.

Black Sabbath are a British heavy metal band from Birmingham, England and are often cited as one of the grandfathers of the genre. Though usually known for playing a fairly slow, sludgy tempo, "After Forever" is a very up-tempo song with a much faster pace than other songs in their catalogue. Still in certain other songs such as "Electric Funeral", "Into the Void" and "Under the Sun (Every Day Comes and Goes)" there is a section in the middle of the song that shifts away from the core music and plays a much faster pace than in the rest of the song, then returns to the original melody. There are those who believe that their song "Symptom of the Universe" from their 1975 release Sabotage album is the first true example of a speed metal song. 

Judas Priest are a British heavy metal band, also formed in Birmingham, England, that often played faster than most rock groups of the time and brought a more "metallic" sound to the guitars. Some songs, such as 1978's "Exciter", were groundbreaking for their sheer ferocity and speed; few, if any, bands exempting Motörhead played with the same tempo.

Exciter (who took their name from the aforementioned Judas Priest song) is a Canadian speed metal band from Ottawa, Ontario, which was formed in 1978. They are widely considered to be one of the first speed metal bands and a seminal influence of the thrash metal genre. Anvil are another Canadian speed metal band, from Toronto, Ontario, who also formed in 1978. To date, the band has released seventeen studio albums, and has been cited as having influenced many notable thrash metal groups, including Metallica, Anthrax, Slayer and Megadeth. 

Accept is a German heavy metal band which played an important role in the development of speed and thrash metal, being part of the German heavy metal scene, which emerged in the early to mid-1980s. Of particular importance was their 1982 track "Fast as a Shark".

Speed metal eventually evolved into thrash metal. Although many tend to equate the two subgenres, others argue that there is a distinct difference between them. In his book Sound of the Beast: The Complete Headbanging History of Heavy Metal, Ian Christe states that "...thrash metal relies more on long, wrenching rhythmic breaks, while speed metal... is a cleaner and more musically intricate subcategory, still loyal to the dueling melodies of classic metal." However, on the very next page, Christe calls speed metal a "subset of thrash metal" and argues that "There was little intrinsic difference between speed metal and thrash metal. With the sudden boom of fast, raging bands, however, it sometimes helped to distinguish between the throbbing, rhythm-heavy thrash metal and something a bit cleaner and more melodic--dubbed speed metal."
Some may argue that first wave black metal bands such as  Venom,  Sodom, and  Bathory were speed metal and that black metal evolved as an extreme form of speed metal. Speed metal also played a major role in formation of power metal, with  Helloween's, one of the "big four" of power metal, first two albums being speed metal, or speed-metal adjacent, in the case of Keeper of the Seven Keys: Part I.

Regional differences
Speed metal's sound varied between various regional scenes. European bands leaned towards the sound of bands like Venom and Motörhead. Japanese bands had a more melodic sound that resembled power metal. North American bands had a faster, more aggressive sound that would later influence the thrash metal movement.

The Speed Metal Swirl 

Banzai Records printed the Speed Metal Swirl on the cover of 18 of their releases. It was a marketing idea by label founder Michel Meese and put together by Gunther Woschank, likely made from an existing design which has been found on a 1976 Shediac, New Brunswick phone book, with the words Speed Metal added.

See also
 List of speed metal bands

References

External links 
 

 
Heavy metal genres
British rock music genres